Events from the year 1772 in Denmark.

Incumbents
 Monarch – Christian VII
 Prime minister – Johann Friedrich Struensee (until 17 January), Ove Høegh-Guldberg

Events

 18 January – Queen Caroline Matilda, Johann Friedrich Struensee and Enevold Brandt was arrested and their rule ousted in a palace coup.
 28 April – Struense and Brandt are executed by beheading at the Eastern Commons outside Copenhagen. Afterwards their bodies are drawn and quartered.
 30 April – The Norwegian Society is founded in Copenhagen as a national venue for Norwegian students.
 16 May – A treaty between Christian VII and the Bey of Algier brings an end to the Danish-Algerian War.
 14 October – Royal Danish Medical Society is founded.

Undated
 Frederick, Hereditary Prince of Denmark is designated as regent of Denmark.
 Mascerades, horse races and foreign line dancers are prohibited.
 The military language for use in writing and commands is changed from German to Danish.

Births
 17 June – Hans Peter Holm, naval officer (died 1812)

Deaths
 April 28
 Enevold Brandt, courtier (born 1737)
 Johann Friedrich Struensee, physician, statesman, de facto regent of Denmark (born 1737)
 8 June – Ulrik Fredrik de Cicignon, military officer (born 1698)
 17 August – Christen Lindencrone, merchant and landowner (born 1703)
 Johanne Seizberg, illustrator and teacher (born 1732)

See also
 A Royal Affair, 2012 film inspired by the events leading up to Struensee's death.

References

 
1770s in Denmark
Denmark
Years of the 18th century in Denmark